Carré (Square) for four orchestras and four choirs (1959–60) is a composition by the German composer Karlheinz Stockhausen, and is Work Number 10 in the composer's catalog of works.

History
Carré was commissioned by the Norddeutscher Rundfunk (NDR) in Hamburg. The essential ideas occurred to Stockhausen in November–December 1958 while on a tour of the United States where, during hours spent each day flying from one location to another, he experienced the slowest temporal rates of change of his life. The work was composed in 1959–60, in collaboration with Stockhausen's assistant Cornelius Cardew, and was premiered on 28 October 1960 in the Festival Hall of the Planten un Blomen Park in Hamburg, as part of the NDR's concert series , with the NDR Chor und NDR Sinfonieorchester, conducted by Mauricio Kagel (orchestra I), Stockhausen (orchestra II), Andrzej Markowski (orchestra III), and Michael Gielen (orchestra IV). The score is dedicated to the former director of Das neue Werk, .

Material and form
Carré is a serial composition in which (together with the concurrently composed Kontakte) Stockhausen for the first time treated spatial distribution on the same level of structural importance as properties such as pitch, rhythm, timbre, dynamics, register, density, and others.

Stockhausen groups Carré with Kontakte (1958–60) and Momente (1962–64/69) as representatives of moment form, in which he tried to compose states and processes in which each moment is a personal, centred one, that can exist on its own and, as something individual, can also always be related to its surroundings and to the whole; something in which everything that happens does not pursue a determined course from a defined beginning to an inevitable end.
A large orchestra of 80 players is divided into four orchestral units, each of approximately the same scoring and each with its own conductor. A mixed choir of between 12 and 16 singers is attached to each orchestra.

Carré unfolds 101 "moments" with durations varying from 1.5 to 90 seconds, each of which is characterised by one or several notes and chords. However, Stockhausen originally planned 252 sections in his draft form scheme, where eight basic categories of sound are arrayed, each with four levels:
 Type: the four solo instruments used to furnish each of the four orchestras with a characteristic timbre: cimbalom, vibraphone, piano, and harp
 Attack: four "attack transient" percussion instruments, also used to differentiate the four orchestras: Indian bells, drums, Alpine cowbells, and cymbals
 Gestalt variation: four parameters within which transformations are to occur: rhythm, "height", timbre, and dynamics
 Density: number of notes present, from one to four
 Register: four principal octave registers
 Duration: four generic values from "short" to "as long as possible"
 Amplitude: four basic dynamic levels, notated in the sketch (but not the score) with numerals
 Colour: four basic timbres: voices, strings, woodwinds, and brass
In contrast to the complex interrelationships of these eight sound categories, the underlying pitch structure of Carré is so simple that Stockhausen was able to write it out on a single sheet of music paper. The basic pitch series used throughout the work is

The regular melodic succession of this all-interval row is obscured compositionally, however, through the grouping of some notes into chords—e.g., in the first section, one three-note chord, F B G, and one two-note chord, B A.

Instrumentation

Orchestra I
 1 Alto Flute (doubling flute)
 1 Oboe
 1 Bass Clarinet in B
 Tenor Saxophone in B
 1 Horn (high, in F)
 1 Trumpet in D
 Bass Trumpet in B
 Bass Trombone
 SATB choir (2 or 3 voices per part)
 Piano
 2 Percussionists:
 2 Tomtoms and 1 Bongo
 3 Alpine Cowbells [Almglocken]
 1 Bass Drum (as large as possible)
 1 Snare Drum (very bright)
 Indian Bells
 Suspended Cymbals (large and thin)
 1 Hihat (as large as possible, thin cymbals)
 1 Gong (as large as possible)
 1 Tamtam (as large as possible)
 4 Violins
 2 Violas
 2 Cellos

Orchestra II
 1 Flute
 1 Cor anglais
 1 Clarinet in B
 1 Bassoon
 2 Horns (1 high, 1 low)
 1 Trumpet (in C)
 1 Tenor Trombone
 SATB choir (2 or 3 voices per part)
 Vibraphone
 2 Percussionists:
 2 Tomtoms and 1 Bongo
 3 Alpine Cowbells [Almglocken]
 1 Bass Drum (as large as possible)
 1 Snare Drum (very bright)
 Indian Bells
 Suspended Cymbals (large and thin)
 1 Hihat (as large as possible, thin cymbals)
 1 Gong (as large as possible)
 1 Tamtam (as large as possible)
 4 Violins
 2 Violas
 2 Cellos

Orchestra III
 1 Oboe
 1 Clarinet in B
 1 Baritone Saxophone in E
 1 Bassoon
 1 Horn (low)
 1 Trumpet (in C)
 1 Alto Trombone
 1 Bass Tuba
 SATB choir (2 or 3 voices per part)
 1 Cimbalom (amplified)
 2 Percussionists:
 2 Tomtoms and 1 Bongo
 3 Alpine Cowbells [Almglocken]
 1 Bass Drum (as large as possible)
 1 Snare Drum (very bright)
 Indian Bells
 Suspended Cymbals (large and thin)
 1 Hihat (as large as possible, thin cymbals)
 1 Gong (as large as possible)
 1 Tamtam (as large as possible)
 4 Violins
 2 Violas
 2 Cellos

Orchestra IV
 1 Flute
 1 Clarinet in A
 1 Alto Saxophone in E
 1 Bassoon
 2 Horns (1 high, 1 low)
 1 Trumpet (in C)
 1 Tenor Trombone
 SATB choir (2 or 3 voices per part)
 1 Harp (amplified—the harp part may be supplemented by an amplified harpsichord)
 2 Percussionists:
 2 Tomtoms and 1 Bongo
 3 Alpine Cowbells [Almglocken]
 1 Snare Drum (very bright)
 Indian Bells
 Suspended Cymbals (large and thin)
 1 Hihat (as large as possible, thin cymbals)
 1 Gong (as large as possible)
 1 Tamtam (as large as possible)
 4 Violins
 2 Violas
 2 Cellos

Discography
1968. WDR Symphony Orchestra, Cologne, conducted by Karlheinz Stockhausen, Andrzej Markowski, Mauricio Kagel, and Michael Gielen. Recorded May 1965; released with Stockhausen's Gruppen on Deutsche Grammophon DG 137 002 (LP), DG921022 (Cassette). [N.p.]: Polydor International.
reissued under the same LP disc number, in the first set of Deutsche Grammophon's Avant Garde series. [Hamburg]: Deutsche Grammophon Gesellschaft, ca. 1972.
reissued on reel-to-reel 7½ ips tape, as DGC 7002. Elk Grove Village, Illinois: Ampex/Deutsche Grammophon, ca. 1974.
reissued on Stockhausen Complete Edition CD 5. Kürten: Stockhausen-Verlag, 1992.

References

Cited sources

Further reading
 Cardew, Cornelius. 1961a. "Report on Stockhausen's Carré" [Part 1]. The Musical Times 102, no. 1424 (October): 619–622.
 Cardew, Cornelius. 1961b. "Report on Stockhausen's Carré: Part 2". The Musical Times 102, no. 1425 (November): 698–700.
 Cott, Jonathan. 1973. Stockhausen: Conversations with the Composer. New York: Simon and Schuster. .
 Driver, Paul. 2010a. "Works of Modern Composers That Move You". The Sunday Times (28 March).
 Driver, Paul. 2010b. "Labours of love; Two Contrasting Concerts of Work by Modern Masters Make Paul Driver Mad with Joy". The Sunday Times (28 March): 30.
 Harvey, Jonathan. 1975. The Music of Stockhausen: An Introduction. Berkeley and Los Angeles: University of California Press.
 Heyworth, Peter. 1971. "One of the Outstanding Scores of Its Time". The New York Times (28 November): D15.
 Kelsall, John. 1975. "Compositional Techniques in the Music of Stockhausen (1951–1970)". PhD diss. Glasgow: University of Glasgow.
 Kurtz, Michael. 1992. Stockhausen: A Biography, translated by Richard Toop. London and Boston: Faber and Faber.  (cloth)  (pbk).
 Maconie, Robin. 2005. Other Planets: The Music of Karlheinz Stockhausen. Lanham, Maryland, Toronto, Oxford: Scarecrow Press. .
 Stockhausen, Karlheinz. 1963. "Momentform". In his Texte zur Musik, vol. 1, 1edited by Dieter Schnebel, 89–210. DuMont Dokumente. Cologne: Verlag M. DuMont Schauberg.
 Stockhausen, Karlheinz. 1971. "Gruppen und Carré". In his Texte zur Musik, vol. 3, edited by Dieter Schnebel, 22–34. Cologne: Verlag M. DuMont Schauberg. .
 Stockhausen, Karlheinz. 1998. "CARRÉ—Ergänzung 1986 zum Vorwärt der 4 Partituren", in his Texte 7, selected and assembled by Christoph von Blumröder, 41–49. Kürten: Stockhausen-Verlag. .
 Wörner, Karl H. 1961. "Current Chronicle: Germany". The Musical Quarterly 47, no. 2 (April): 243–247.

External links
Gruppen and Carré essay by Ingvar Norden
Stockhausen: Sounds in Space – Carré Analysis and Listening Guide

Media
Sound examples: Carré (selections)

20th-century classical music
Compositions by Karlheinz Stockhausen
1960 compositions
Serial compositions
Spatial music
Music with dedications
Music commissioned by Norddeutscher Rundfunk